I, Too, Am Harvard is a campaign primarily expressed as a collection of photos that has been posted on Tumblr to illustrate the personal experiences of black students at Harvard University. The multimedia project was the result of interviews with 61 Harvard undergraduate students holding signs bearing messages about the experiences of black students at Harvard.

Background
From 2010 through 2014, Harvard's admissions of minorities (blacks, Latinos, and Asian-Americans) have ranged between 43% and 45.6%. As of 2014, African Americans make up 9.4% of the approximately 7,500 undergraduates at Harvard.

Origin
Kimiko Matsuda-Lawrence, a Harvard undergraduate, created the multimedia project and campaign as an independent study project (under the direction of Professor Glenda Carpio during the fall of 2013) that interviewed minority students about their experiences at Harvard. They reported feelings of alienation about the Harvard campus, being the lone black student in some classes, or feeling uncomfortable about comments and social interactions with other students on campus. 

Matsuda-Lawrence reported that students made comments such as "I've never told anyone this before" or "I've never been able to talk about this." The students comments were kept anonymous and she used them to write a play.  To promote the play, she assembled a group of students to help create the multimedia project that appears on Tumblr. The Tumblr project consists of photos taken of students holding signs with racially insensitive and offensive remarks by peers and response they would like to make. Examples of signs included "No, I will not teach you how to 'twerk'" and "Don't you wish you were white like the rest of us?"

Aims and response
The project and campaign aim to the personal experiences of minority students at Harvard, especially those that have left them feeling alienated at the university. By March 6, 2014, a link on BuzzFeed had produced over a million views. In an email to undergraduate students, Donald Pfister, interim dean of Harvard College, expressed support for the project and said: "Harvard is also about inclusion. This photo campaign, based on a play which will premiere Friday night, is a great example of students speaking about how we can become a stronger community. 'I, Too, Am Harvard' makes clear that our conversation about community does not and should not stop."

Spread to other universities and colleges
Student organizers at Harvard reported messages of support from other universities such as Yale University, Duke University, the University of Pennsylvania, McGill University and University of Oxford. Inspired by "I, Too, Am Harvard" campaign, minority students at McGill University, the University of Oxford and the University of Cambridge developed similar multimedia campaigns.

References

External links
 Official website: I, Too, Am Harvard

Harvard University
Multimedia